The Samoa Public Library, also known as the Nelson Memorial Public Library, is the main public library in Samoa.

It is in the capital Apia on the island of Upolu and is sometimes referred to as Apia Library.

Library services in Samoa are administered by the Ministry of Education, Sports and Culture.

History
The library was set up in 1956 with the current building on Beach Road officially opened in 1960. Funding for the building was received from the Samoa government, New Zealand and the family of patriot, Mau leader and businessman Olaf Frederick Nelson. The library is named in Nelson's honour.

Savai'i branch
Savai'i Public Library is the only branch of the central library, in Salelologa on the island of Savai'i.

References

External links
Library Association of Samoa website

Education in Samoa
Libraries in Samoa
1956 establishments in Western Samoa Trust Territory
Libraries established in 1956
Library buildings completed in 1960
Buildings and structures in Apia